Southwest Value Partners (SWVP) is an American privately held real estate investment company. It is headquartered in San Diego, with an office in Scottsdale, Arizona, US.

SWVP was founded in 1990 by Robert Sarver and Millard Seldin;  Sarver remained a principal, with the managing partners being Mark Schlossberg and Cary Mack.

In 1995, SWVP purchased the Emerald Plaza in San Diego;  the company controlled almost 30% of the Class A office space in downtown San Diego. In 2004, SWVP sold the Emerald Plaza and two other San Diego office buildings to Santa Ana real estate firm Triple Net Properties for $274.5 million.

In December 2017, SWVP bought the Bank of America Center and two other towers in downtown Orlando, Florida from Cousins Properties for more than $200 million.

In 2018, SWVP demolished the Draper Tower and the Sullivan Tower in Nashville, Tennessee to develop Nashville Yards, the site of Amazon's projected Operations Center of Excellence. In August 2019, SVP "made a meaningful financial commitment on a multiyear basis" to the Susan G. Komen Breast Cancer Foundation, with relevant events planned at Nashville Yards.

In June 2020, SWVP confirmed it had reached a deal to acquire the Union Station Hotel in Nashville.

References

External links
List of past acquisitions, with images

Real estate companies of the United States
Companies based in San Diego
Privately held companies based in California
1990 establishments in California
Financial services companies established in 1990